Depaul, de Paul or DePaul may refer to:

De Paul (surname)

 De Paul College, Eluru, in Eluru, Andhra Pradesh, India
 DePaul University, in Chicago, Illinois, United States
 DePaul College Prep, in Chicago, Illinois, United States
 DePaul Catholic High School, Wayne, New Jersey, United States